Colobothea pulchella is a species of beetle in the family Cerambycidae. It was described by Bates in 1865. It is found in Brazil, French Guiana, and Venezuela.

References

pulchella
Beetles described in 1865